David Sanford Milch (born March 23, 1945) is an American writer and producer of television series. He has created several television shows, including ABC's NYPD Blue (1993–2005), co-created with Steven Bochco, and HBO's Deadwood (2004–2006, 2019).

Early life and education
Milch graduated with a B.A. summa cum laude from Yale University, where he won the Tinker Prize in English, was elected to Phi Beta Kappa, and was a member of the Delta Kappa Epsilon chapter, along with future US President George W. Bush. Milch earned a Master of Fine Arts with distinction from the Iowa Writers' Workshop at the University of Iowa. 

To avoid the draft during the Vietnam War, Milch enrolled in Yale Law School, but he was expelled for allegedly shooting out a police car siren with a shotgun.

Career
Milch worked as a writing teacher and lecturer in English literature at Yale. During his teaching career, he assisted Robert Penn Warren and Cleanth Brooks in the writing of several college textbooks on literature. Milch's poetry and fiction have been published in The Atlantic Monthly and the Southern Review.

In 1982, Milch wrote a script for Hill Street Blues, which became the episode "Trial by Fury". This began his career in television. He worked five seasons on Hill Street Blues as executive story editor and then as executive producer. Milch earned two Writers Guild Awards, a Humanitas prize, and a Primetime Emmy Award while working on that show.

Milch created NYPD Blue with Steven Bochco and served as executive producer of that series for seven seasons. He received three Primetime Emmy Awards during his time with the series. Milch co-created the patrol police drama Brooklyn South with Bochco, Bill Clark, and William M. Finkelstein in 1997 while still working on NYPD Blue. After NYPD Blue, Milch created a CBS series called Big Apple.

From 2004 to 2006, Milch produced Deadwood, a dramatic series for HBO. Milch served as creator, writer, and executive producer. The series received critical acclaim and garnered Milch two Primetime Emmy Award nominations for writing and producing. The series ended in 2006 after three seasons. There were plans for two feature-length movies to conclude the series, ultimately resulting in a single film released by HBO in 2019. Actor Ian McShane presented David Milch with the 2006 Outstanding Television Writer Award at the Austin Film Festival.

Milch began production in 2006 on John from Cincinnati, another dramatic series for HBO. The series was canceled after its first season. Initial ratings had been lower than expected but increased steadily. Ratings for the final episode were more than 3 million. In October 2007, HBO renewed its contract with Milch. A pilot was commissioned for Last of the Ninth, "a drama set in the New York Police Department during the 1970s, when the Knapp Commission was formed to ferret out corruption in the force." Collaborating with Milch on Last of the Ninth was former NYPD Blue writer and friend Bill Clark. In December 2008, The Hollywood Reporter stated that Last of the Ninth would not be picked up by the network.

In January 2010, Milch announced that he was developing a new drama for HBO entitled Luck, based around the culture of horse racing. Michael Mann directed the pilot and Dustin Hoffman was cast in the lead role. HBO picked up the series on July 14, 2010. The series ceased production after three horse deaths on set, having aired one season. Other unrealized projects of Milch's during the early 2010s included a film adaptation of Quantic Dream's 2010 video game Heavy Rain, a reunion with NYPD Blue collaborator Steven Bochco on an NBC legal drama, and a series of films and television series for HBO based on the literary works of William Faulkner. 

In July 2013 HBO announced at the Television Critics Association Press Tour that Milch was developing a new series for the cable network tentatively titled The Money. The show would depict a dynastic New York media family. Irish actor Brendan Gleeson was cast in the lead role as a family patriarch and media mogul. It was announced on March 4, 2014 that HBO had passed on the project.

On April 20, 2017, Ian McShane announced that Milch had submitted a script for a two-hour Deadwood movie to HBO. "[A] two-hour movie script has been delivered to HBO. If they don't deliver [a finished product], blame them." McShane said he had spoken to Milch about the script and hoped to soon discuss beginning the film. He also said of the original cast returning that "we'd all love to do it ... It would be nice to see all of the old gang again." Deadwood: The Movie began production in October 2018 and premiered in May 2019. The film received critical acclaim and a nomination for the Primetime Emmy Award for Outstanding Television Movie.

Personal life
Milch is Jewish. He has been married to Rita Stern since 1982. They have three children.

Milch has stated he has bipolar disorder. He developed a heart condition in the 1990s. During the filming of NYPD Blue, he suffered a heart attack while arguing with actor David Caruso over the script. 

He was diagnosed with Alzheimer's disease in 2015 shortly before beginning work on the script for the Deadwood film. As of 2019, Milch lives in an assisted-living facility. On September 13, 2022, Milch published a memoir titled Life's Work.

Thoroughbred horse racing
Milch is an owner of thoroughbred racehorses. As a co-owner with Mark and Jack Silverman, he won the 1992 Breeders' Cup Juvenile with the colt Gilded Time. Milch owned outright Val Royal who captured the 2001 Breeders' Cup Mile.

Television credits
Hill Street Blues (1982–87)
Bay City Blues (1983) 
Beverly Hills Buntz (1987–88) (co-creator, with Jeffrey Lewis) 
Capital News (1990) (co-creator, with Christian Williams) 
L.A. Law (1992) 
NYPD Blue (1993–2005) (co-creator, with Steven Bochco) 
Murder One (1995)
Brooklyn South (1997–98) (co-creator, with Steven Bochco) 
Total Security (1997) (co-creator, with Steven Bochco, Charles H. Eglee, and Theresa Rebeck) 
Big Apple (2001) (creator)
Deadwood (2004–06) (creator)
John from Cincinnati (2007) (co-creator, with Kem Nunn) 
Last of the Ninth (2009) (co-creator, with Bill Clark) 
Luck (2011–12) (creator)
The Money (2013) (creator)
True Detective (2019)
Deadwood: The Movie (2019)

Bibliography
 Milch, David and Clark, Bill. True Blue: The Real Stories Behind NYPD Blue. New York: William Morrow & Co, 1995. 
 Milch, David. Deadwood: Stories of the Black Hills. New York: Bloomsbury USA, 2006. 
 Milch, David. Life's Work: A Memoir. New York: Random House, 2022.

Awards and recognition
1983 Emmy Award, Outstanding Writing for a Drama Series (Hill Street Blues, "Trial By Fury")
1994 Edgar Award, Best Episode in a Television Series Teleplay (NYPD Blue, "4B or Not 4B")
1995 Emmy Award, Best Drama Series (NYPD Blue)
1995 Edgar Award, Best Episode in a Television Series Teleplay (NYPD Blue, "Simone Says") (shared with Steven Bochco and Walon Green)
1997 Emmy Award, Outstanding Writing for a Drama Series (NYPD Blue, "Where's 'Swaldo")
1998 Emmy Award, Outstanding Writing for a Drama Series (NYPD Blue, "Lost Israel: Part 2") 
2006 Austin Film Festival, Outstanding Television Writer Award recipient
2019 TCA Award, TCA Career Achievement Award

References

Further reading, audio interviews, and videos
 (Video: 80-minutes.)

 Profile of Milch.
 (Video: 1:23:15.)

Notes

External links

David Milch Papers. Yale Collection of American Literature, Beinecke Rare Book and Manuscript Library, Yale University.

Television producers from New York (state)
American television writers
American male television writers
Jewish American writers
Edgar Award winners
American racehorse owners and breeders
Writers from Buffalo, New York
Iowa Writers' Workshop alumni
Yale University alumni
1945 births
Living people
Primetime Emmy Award winners
Showrunners
Writers Guild of America Award winners
Screenwriters from New York (state)
People with Alzheimer's disease
People with bipolar disorder
21st-century American Jews
Jewish American television producers